1947 Iso-Heikkilä, provisional designation , is a carbonaceous Eos asteroid from the outer region of the asteroid belt, approximately 30 kilometers in diameter. It was discovered on 4 March 1935, by Finnish astronomer Yrjö Väisälä at Turku Observatory in Southwest Finland. It was named after the location of the discovering observatory, which is also known as the "Iso-Heikkilä Observatory".

Orbit and classification 

Iso-Heikkilä is a member of the Eos family, the largest asteroid family in the outer main belt consisting of nearly 10,000 asteroids. It  orbits the Sun in the outer main-belt at a distance of 3.0–3.3 AU once every 5 years and 7 months (2,046 days). Its orbit has an eccentricity of 0.04 and an inclination of 12° with respect to the ecliptic. As no precoveries were taken, and no prior identifications were made, the body's observation arc begins with its discovery observation.

Physical characteristics 

The C-type asteroid has been characterized as a rare and reddish D-type asteroid by Pan-STARRS large-scale photometric survey.

Diameter and albedo 

According to the surveys carried out by the Japanese Akari satellite and NASA's Wide-field Infrared Survey Explorer with its subsequent NEOWISE mission, Iso-Heikkilä measures 30.7 and 31.6 kilometers in diameter, and its surface has an albedo of 0.091 and 0.049, respectively. The Collaborative Asteroid Lightcurve Link derives an albedo of 0.0571 and a diameter of 29.2 kilometers with an absolute magnitude of 11.4.

Rotation period 

In October 2005, a rotational lightcurve of Iso-Heikkilä was obtained from photometric observations by Slovak astronomer Adrián Galád. It gave a rotation period of 5.0158 hours with a brightness variation of 0.35 magnitude. However, the lightcurve is ambiguous and several alternative period solutions are possible

Naming 

This minor planet was named for the farm, which is located in the Iso-Heikkilä district and owned by Turku University. It became the site of the Turku Observatory, which is also called Iso-Heikkilä Observatory. It was the observatory's first minor planet discovery. The official naming citation was published by the Minor Planet Center on 1 August 1980.

References

External links 
 Asteroid Lightcurve Database (LCDB), query form (info )
 Dictionary of Minor Planet Names, Google books
 Asteroids and comets rotation curves, CdR – Observatoire de Genève, Raoul Behrend
 Discovery Circumstances: Numbered Minor Planets (1)-(5000) – Minor Planet Center
 
 

 

001947
Discoveries by Yrjö Väisälä
Named minor planets
19350304